Premeditated Murder (Ubistvo s predumišljajem) is a 1995 Serbian film directed by Gorčin Stojanović starring Branka Katić and Nebojša Glogovac. It is based on a novel by Slobodan Selenić.

Cast 
 Branka Katić - Jelena Panic (Bulika)
 Nebojša Glogovac - Bogdan Bilogorac
 Ana Sofrenović - Jelena Ljubisavljevic
 Dragan Mićanović - Jovan
 Sergej Trifunović - Krsman Jaksic
 Rade Marković - Branko Kojovic
 Ljubiša Samardžić - Vidosav
 Danilo Stojković - Stavra Arandjelovic
 Svetozar Cvetković - Debeli
 Predrag Ejdus - Doktor Cvetkovic
 Aljoša Vučković - Morozov

References

External links
 

1995 films
1990s war drama films
Films based on Serbian novels
1990s Serbian-language films
Serbian thriller films
Yugoslav Wars films
Films set in Serbia
Works about the Croatian War of Independence
1995 drama films